This page is a chronology of the Motown singing group the Supremes. It lists the members of the group during all phases of the group's history, and also includes a timeline.

The Primettes

1959 – Summer 1960
 Diana Ross
 Mary Wilson
 Florence Ballard
 Betty McGlown

Summer 1960 – January 1961
 Diana Ross
 Mary Wilson
 Florence Ballard
 Barbara Martin

The Supremes

January 1961 – Spring 1962
 Diana Ross
 Mary Wilson
 Florence Ballard
 Barbara Martin

Spring 1962 – June 1967
 Diana Ross
 Mary Wilson
 Florence Ballard

Diana Ross & the Supremes

June – July 1967
 Diana Ross
 Mary Wilson
 Florence Ballard

July 1967 – January 1970
 Diana Ross
 Mary Wilson
 Cindy Birdsong

The Supremes

January 1970 – April 1972
 Jean Terrell
 Mary Wilson
 Cindy Birdsong

April 1972 – October 1973
 Jean Terrell
 Mary Wilson
 Lynda Laurence

October 1973 – February 1976
 Scherrie Payne
 Mary Wilson
 Cindy Birdsong

February 1976 – June 1977
 Scherrie Payne
 Mary Wilson
 Susaye Greene

Timeline

The Supremes
Supremes, The
Articles which contain graphical timelines